The Geneva Conventions and United Nations Personnel (Protocols) Act 2009 (c 6) is an Act of the Parliament of the United Kingdom. It was enacted to give effect to the Third Additional Protocol to the Geneva Conventions and to the Optional Protocol to the Convention on the Safety of United Nations and Associated Personnel.

Section 1
This section amends the Geneva Conventions Act 1957. It came into force on 5 April 2010. It was extended, with modifications, to Guernsey, on 15 January 2011.

Section 2
This section amends section 4 of the United Nations Personnel Act 1997. It came into force on 28 July 2010.

Section 3 - Commencement, extent and short title
This section came into force on the beginning of 2 July 2009.

See also
 Geneva Conventions

References
Halsbury's Statutes,

External links
The Geneva Conventions and United Nations Personnel (Protocols) Act 2009, as amended from the National Archives.
The Geneva Conventions and United Nations Personnel (Protocols) Act 2009, as originally enacted from the National Archives.
Explanatory notes to the Geneva Conventions and United Nations Personnel (Protocols) Act 2009.

United Kingdom Acts of Parliament 2009
National laws incorporating the Geneva Conventions